Ivyinichaman is an island in Shelikhov Bay, Sea of Okhotsk.

Geography
This relatively flat island is 1.35 km long and 0.4 km wide. It is located off the eastern coast of Penzhina Bay, separated from the continental shore by a 0.6 km wide sound. Administratively it belongs to the Kamchatka Krai. Konus Island is located 7 km to the northeast.

References

External links
Russian Army Maps - Map 001m--p57_58

Islands of the Sea of Okhotsk
Islands of the Russian Far East
Uninhabited islands of Russia